The Principality of Reuss-Greiz, called the Principality of the Reuss Elder Line after 1848, was a sovereign state in the German Empire, ruled by members of the House of Reuss. The Counts Reuss of Greiz, Lower-Greiz and Upper-Greiz were elevated to princely status in 1778 and thereafter bore the title of Prince Reuss, Elder Line, or Prince Reuss of Greiz.

Similarly to the more numerous Reuss Junior Line, the male members of this house were all named "Heinrich", in honour of Emperor Heinrich VI, who had benefited the family. They were numbered sequentially by birth, rather than by reign, with the last series beginning with Heinrich I (born 1693) and ending with Heinrich XXIV (1878–1927).

The territory had an area of 317 km2 and over 72,000 inhabitants in 1910.

RG preserved the Frankfurt Parliament flag, which later became the flag of Germany.

Territory
In 1919, in the aftermath of World War I, the territory of the Elder Line was merged with that of the Junior Line as the People's State of Reuss, which was incorporated into the new state of Thuringia in 1920. The Elder Line died out in 1927 with the death of the childless Heinrich XXIV, after which its claims were passed to the Junior Line.

Princes of Reuss-Greiz (1778–1918)

Princes post-monarchy
Heinrich XXIV, 6th Prince 1918–1927 (1878–1927)

To Reuss Junior Line on the death of Prince Heinrich XXIV

Notable figures
Princess Hermine Reuss of Greiz, second wife of former German Emperor Wilhelm II
Princess Caroline Reuss of Greiz, wife of Wilhelm Ernst, Grand Duke of Saxe-Weimar-Eisenach
Prince Heinrich XV of Reuss-Plauen, Generalfeldmarschall of the Holy Roman Empire

See also
Flag of Germany, whose modern colors match those of the Reuss-Greiz principality

 
States and territories disestablished in 1918
States and territories established in 1778
States of the Confederation of the Rhine
Reuss
States of the German Confederation
States of the German Empire
Upper Saxon Circle
Former states and territories of Thuringia
 Elder
1778 establishments in the Holy Roman Empire
1918 disestablishments in Germany
States of the North German Confederation